ROOKIE Racing Co., Ltd., also known as Rookie Racing (stylized as ROOKIE Racing) is a Japanese racing team that competes in Super Formula, Super GT & Super Taikyu. Rookie Racing is a sister team of Toyota GAZOO Racing and based close to Fuji Speedway.

History
In 2017, Tatsuya Kataoka launched a private team "T's Concept" for the purpose of training young and gentleman drivers. T's Concept participated in the Super Taikyu ST-4 class with two Toyota 86's sponsored by Ogura Clutch. Drivers such as Ogura Clutch's President Yasuhiro Ogura and Miki Koyama competed with T's Concept on the team's inaugural season on Super Taikyu. T's Concept continued to field two cars for the 2018 season and signed Masahiro Sasaki to compete alongside Ogura in the #29 team while Tohjiro Azuma and Daisuke Matsunaga competed in the #28 team. One of the T's Concept cars was later rebranded into "ROOKIE Racing" in 2019 with Daisuke Toyota, son of Toyota president Akio, and former GT500 champion Akira Iida joining the team as Rookie's lead drivers in the 2019 Super Taikyu season.

In 2020, Akio Toyoda purchased the team in its entirety and entered both Super Formula and Super GT after Team LeMans left from both series at the end of the 2019 season. While the team had previously entered rookie drivers that was part of the Toyota Young Driver Programme, Rookie's name was taken from Akio's pet dog "Rookie". In the team's first year on Super GT, Rookie's entry was run as part of Team Cerumo. Kazuya Oshima drove in both the Super Formula and Super GT championship with Sho Tsuboi acting as Oshima's teammate in Super GT. In 2021, Rookie took full charge of the team from Cerumo. Oshima stays with the team and compete both series and was paired up with Kenta Yamashita for 2021 Super GT season. For 2022, the team set up new factory base close to Fuji Speedway.

References 

Japanese auto racing teams
Super Formula teams
Super GT teams
Auto racing teams established in 2017
Toyota in motorsport